Jonathan Rhys Meyers (born Jonathan Michael Francis O'Keeffe; 27 July 1977) is an Irish actor, model and musician. He is known for his roles in the films Michael Collins (1996), Velvet Goldmine (1998), Titus (1999), Bend It Like Beckham (2002), Alexander (2004), Match Point (2005), Mission: Impossible III (2006) and his television roles as Elvis Presley in the biographical miniseries Elvis (2005), for which he won a Golden Globe Award and earned a Primetime Emmy Award nomination, as King Henry VIII in the historical drama The Tudors (2007–10), which earned him two Golden Globe Award nominations, and in the NBC drama series Dracula (2013–14) as the title character. He also starred as Bishop Heahmund, a character inspired by the Catholic Saint of the same name, in the History Channel television series Vikings.

Meyers has continued to star in other films, such as Albert Nobbs in 2011. In 2013, Meyers appeared as the villain Valentine Morgenstern in The Mortal Instruments: City of Bones, based on Cassandra Clare's novel, City of Bones; he appeared in the 2015 film Stonewall, directed by Roland Emmerich; in 2017, he starred in The 12th Man; and in 2018 he won the Best Actor award at the Manchester Film Festival for his starring role in Damascus Cover. In 2020, he was listed as number 44 on The Irish Times’ list of Ireland's greatest film actors.

Meyers has been the face of several Hugo Boss advertising campaigns. He has also been involved in several charitable causes, including the Hope Foundation and the children's charity Barretstown. Meyers is married to Mara Lane, and they have one son together.

Early life
Meyers was born on 27 July 1977 in Dublin, Ireland the first of four boys for Geraldine (née Myers; 1957–2007) and folk musician John O'Keeffe, and brought up in County Cork. His family is Catholic, and his three younger brothers are professional musicians. He attended North Monastery Christian Brothers School.

After being expelled from North Monastery for truancy, he spent much of his time working and socialising in pool halls. Casting agents looking for Irish boys to appear in War of the Buttons spotted him at a Cork pool hall, the Victoria Sporting Club, and invited him to audition. Although passed over for War of the Buttons, the casting agents encouraged him to pursue a career in acting.

Career

Early work (1994–2004) 
Taking on the name Rhys Meyers because he thought his real name O'Keeffe was boring, his first acting role came in the film, A Man of No Importance (1994). In 1996, he appeared in Michael Collins, as the Anti-Treaty IRA sniper who kills the title character. He played a David Bowie-inspired glam rock star in Velvet Goldmine (1998). In 1999, he appeared in Ride with the Devil as psychopathic Bushwhacker Pitt Mackeson. He starred as Steerpike in the BBC's Gormenghast (2000); played a dedicated girls' football coach in Bend It Like Beckham (2002); played in Vanity Fair (2004) opposite Reese Witherspoon; and co-starred in 2004 in Oliver Stone's epic Alexander in which he played Cassander.

Breakthrough with Match Point and The Tudors (2005–2017) 

The following year Meyers starred in Woody Allen's drama Match Point (2005), for which he received a Chopard Trophy at the Cannes Film Festival, and in the CBS 4-hour mini-series Elvis (2005) as Elvis Presley alongside Randy Quaid as Colonel Tom Parker, but did not sing for his role in the miniseries. The latter earned him an Emmy nomination and a Golden Globe win. In 2006, he appeared in Mission: Impossible III.

He starred in the CBC/Showtime co-production The Tudors (2007) as Henry VIII. He was nominated for the Golden Globe for Best Actor in a Television Drama in 2007 for the role.

Subsequent projects include August Rush (2007). In 2008, he appeared in The Children of Huang Shi, and in 2010, Shelter and From Paris with Love.

In 2011, he starred as Solal in Belle du Seigneur, an English language film adaptation of Albert Cohen's novel Belle du Seigneur. The film was released in Russia on 29 November 2012 and in France on 19 June 2013 after premiering at the Champs Elysees Film Festival.

In 2013, Meyers was cast as Dracula in NBC's television series Dracula alongside Oliver Jackson-Cohen and Jessica De Gouw. It was also announced in May 2013 that Meyers was to participate in the recording of his brothers' album entitled Blossom, which was released on 21 April 2014.

On 23 October 2014, he received The Irish Post Legend Award at the London Hilton on Park Lane in recognition of his remarkable achievements in Film & Television over the previous 20 years.

In 2017, He starred in the movie Black Butterfly and was nominated for Best supporting Actor at the Madrid International Festival. Meyers later reunited with Michael Hirst and starred as Bishop Heahmund in the television series Vikings.

Independent films and varied roles (2018–present) 
Meyers played the lead in the spy thriller Damascus Cover, based on the novel by Howard Kaplan. It premiered on 23 September 2017, at the Boston Film Festival and was released on July 20, 2018 by Vertical Entertainment. he won the best actor award at Boston and Manchester International Festival

Meyers portrays Patrick Pearse, a political activist and one of the leaders of the bloody 1916 Irish Easter Rising, in the centennial commemoration biopic film The Rising, written and produced by Kevin McCann.

In 2020, Meyers played in Edge of the World , a biographical picture of the British explorer Sir James Brooke, as well as the lead role in the movie American Nights, a neo-noir thriller co-starring Emile Hirsch, Paz Vega, and Jeremy Piven.

In 2021, he started as Shiro in Yakuza Princess, a Brazilian action thriller film directed by Vicente Amorim based on the graphic novel Samurai Shiro by Danilo Beyruth. He also starred in the horror-thriller Hide and Seek.

In 2022, he starred in The Good Neighbour and Wifelike.

Music 
A self-taught singer and guitarist, Meyers has appeared in a number of musical roles. His first such role was as "Brian Slade" in Velvet Goldmine; two of the songs he sang ("Baby's on Fire" and "Tumbling Down") are on the film's soundtrack. He sang briefly in the television mini-series version of The Magnificent Ambersons, performed in studio scenes of the miniseries Elvis and played the flute in Gormenghast.

In the 2007 music drama August Rush, he performed on-screen as singer-songwriter Louis Connelly and is credited for four songs on the soundtrack – "Break", "Moondance", "Something Inside" and "This Time". Of the four, "This Time" and "Break" were considered in the Best Original Song category of the 80th Academy Awards. "This Time" was not released as a single but peaked at number 84 in the Canadian Hot 100.

Upcoming projects 
In 2022, it was revealed that he would be joining the cast of the thriller Altitude.

Meyers will star in the upcoming hijacking thriller film 97 Minutes, directed by Timo Vuorensola.

Personal life

Relationships and family 
For a year in the late 1990s, Meyers dated his Velvet Goldmine co-star, Toni Collette.

From 2004 until 2012, he was in a relationship with Reena Hammer, daughter of makeup artist Ruby Hammer.

On 20 November 2007, his mother, Mary Geraldine O'Keeffe, died at Mercy University Hospital, Cork, aged 51, following a short, undisclosed illness.

Meyers has a history of suicide attempts. On 30 June 2011 it was reported that he was taken to hospital by ambulance after a suspected suicide attempt. He attempted suicide again in 2016. Paramedics responding to an emergency call discovered him slumped on the floor. They called police after he refused treatment at the scene for more than 30 minutes. 

During 2016, he married Mara Lane. Their son was born in December 2016. In September 2017, Lane revealed that she had miscarried a second child.

In 2019, Meyers credited his family, and fatherhood in particular, with making him the happiest he has ever been: "Once you have your first child, you become the past. We're all busy giving out to ourselves and driving ourselves forward. A child gives you a new perspective on life."

In 2022 he listed his Nichols Canyon home in Los Angeles for sale. It was reported that the home had previously been listed for sale and was made available as a rental property until 2012 when it was listed for $1.6 million and again in 2018 it was offered for $1.795 million. The 2022 listing has the home for sale at $1.85 million.

Alcoholism 
In 2007, Meyers' representative confirmed that Meyers had entered an alcohol-treatment programme.

In November 2007, he was arrested at Dublin Airport for intoxication and disturbing the peace.

In 2009, he was detained in Paris by French police for allegedly assaulting an airport lounge employee while drunk.

In 2010, at John F. Kennedy International Airport, he verbally abused and used racist language against airline staff and officials, who had refused him access to the boarding area after he had become intoxicated in the first-class lounge. He was banned by United Airlines as a result.

His representative confirmed Meyers was receiving treatment again in 2010. In November 2011, he was ordered by a French court to pay restitution of €1,000 and was given a judgment of a suspended sentence for public intoxication 24 months earlier.

After his wife suffered a miscarriage in 2017, Meyers relapsed at Dublin Airport.

In 2018, he broke his sobriety on a flight, resulting in a dispute with his wife at Los Angeles International Airport. In an interview with Larry King later that year, Meyers addressed the incident, stating "... I shouldn't drink. It doesn't suit me and I had been sober for a long time." He insisted that he had learned his lesson and was sober again.

Meyers crashed his car in Malibu, California, in November 2020. Responding police discovered he was intoxicated after a field test was performed and he was charged with two drunk driving offences. Court documents obtained by TMZ showed that he received a $500 fine and an order to attend alcohol and counselling programmes as part of his agreeing to the court's plea deal. He was further ordered to undergo a 12-month summary probation with no jail time, provided that he did not break the law during that period.

Honours 
On 5 October 2008, Meyers received an Honorary Patronage from the Trinity College Philosophical Society in Dublin.

In 2014, he was honoured at The Irish Post Awards by the presentation of the Legend Award for his contributions to the film and entertainment industry.

Charity work 
In February 2008, Meyers was named the ambassador for the Hope Foundation, a charity formed in his native Cork to support the street children of Calcutta.

He is also an ambassador for the Irish children’s charity Barretstown which supports children affected by serious illness. In 2019, he and fellow actor Aidan Gillen helped launch Barretstown's new Press Play campaign which aimed to raise additional funds to serve more children and their families.

Filmography

Film

Television

Discography

Awards and nominations

References

External links

 
 

1977 births
20th-century Irish male actors
21st-century Irish male actors
Best Miniseries or Television Movie Actor Golden Globe winners
Irish expatriates in the United States
Irish male film actors
Irish male television actors
Irish expatriates in England
Living people
People from County Cork
Irish male models
People educated at North Monastery
Chopard Trophy for Male Revelation winners